McGregor's cuckooshrike (Malindangia mcgregori) or the sharp-tailed cuckooshrike, is a species of bird in the family Campephagidae. It is endemic to Mindanao island (Philippines).

This species was formerly placed in the genus Coracina. A molecular phylogenetic study published in 2010 found the genus Coracina was non-monophyletic. In the resulting reorganization to create monophyletic genera, McGregor's cuckooshrike is the only species placed in the resurrected genus Malindangia.

Its natural habitat is subtropical or tropical moist montane forest. It is becoming rare due to habitat loss.

References

McGregor's cuckooshrike
Birds of Mindanao
McGregor's cuckooshrike
Taxonomy articles created by Polbot